Sameer Hussain (born 14 February 1982) is a Pakistani field hockey player. He competed in the men's tournament at the 2000 Summer Olympics.

References

External links
 

1982 births
Living people
Pakistani male field hockey players
Olympic field hockey players of Pakistan
Field hockey players at the 2000 Summer Olympics
Place of birth missing (living people)